Karl Ludwig d'Elsa (born 1 November 1849 in Dresden – died 20 July 1922 in Tannenfeld bei Nöbdenitz, Löbichau, Thuringia) was a Royal Saxon army officer who was a Generaloberst in the First World War and awarded the Pour le Mérite.

Life and Military Career
Karl Ludwig d'Elsa was born on 1 September 1849 in Dresden in the Kingdom of Saxony, the son of Ludwig Ferdinand d'Elsa (1806–1882), an Oberstleutnant (Lieutenant Colonel), and Huberta Louise (née von Brandenstein, died 1911).

d'Elsa joined the Cadet Corps in Easter 1864 and on 1 April 1869 was appointed as an ensign in the 101st (2nd Royal Saxon) Grenadiers "Emperor William, King of Prussia" of the Royal Saxon Army. From October 1869 to April 1870 he was assigned to the military school in Erfurt and promoted to 2nd Lieutenant on 29 July 1870. From 1 September 1870 he was adjutant of the first battalion of his regiment, with whom he participated in the Franco-Prussian War.  He participated in the battles of St. Privat, Beaumont and Sedan, and the Siege of Paris.  For his service in the Franco-Prussian War, he was awarded the Iron Cross (1870).

After the war d'Elsa received further training from 1 October 1871 to 1 March 1872 at the Military Riding Institute Dresden. From 24 June 1873 to 17 April 1875 he was regimental adjutant in his parent regiment, and then of the 45th (1st Royal Saxon) Infantry Brigade. In 1874, he was promoted to 1st Lieutenant.  From 1878 to 1881 he was assigned as a company commander in the Corps of Cadets. On 1 April 1881 he was promoted to captain and was assigned as company commander of the 2nd Company of the 100th (1st Royal Saxon) Life Grenadiers. Two years later he became the company commander of the 1st Company of the regiment. In 1887, d'Elsa was adjutant of the XII (1st Royal Saxon) Corps, and in 1889 he was promoted to major.

In 1892 he became commander of the 13th (2nd Royal Saxon) Jäger Bataillon. In 1893 he became lieutenant colonel, and in 1895 he was appointed as chief of General Army Section at the Saxon Ministry of War. After D'Elsa was promoted to colonel in 1896, he commanded the 101st (2nd Royal Saxon) Grenadiers "Emperor William, King of Prussia", after which he led as a Generalmajor (promoted 1899) the 48th (4th Royal Saxon) Infantry Brigade (1900–1902) and the 64th (6th Royal Saxon) Infantry Brigade (1902–1904). From 4 September 1902 d'Elsa served as General à la suite of George, King of Saxony and his promotion to Generalleutnant on 23 April 1904 serving as adjutant general. From 19 June 1904 d'Elsa served as commander of the 24th (2nd Royal Saxon) Division; he was promoted to General der Infanterie on 23 September 1908. On 29 March 1910 he was appointed commanding general of XII (1st Royal Saxon) Corps, one of the top three peacetime positions in the Saxon contingent of the Imperial German Army.

World War I
Karl d'Elsa was in command of XII (1st Royal Saxon) Corps at the outset of World War I, part of the predominantly Saxon 3rd Army on the right wing of the forces that invaded France as part of the Schlieffen Plan offensive in August 1914.  He led the XII Corps at the First Battle of the Marne and First Battle of the Aisne.  On 17 April 1916 he was given command of Armee-Abteilung A on the Western Front but was placed on inactive reserve status on 4 January 1917.

He was decorated with the Pour le Mérite on 1 September 1916.

Later life
D'Elsa was placed on inactive reserve status in early 1917.  On 23 January 1918, he was promoted to the rank of Charakter of Generaloberst (an honorary rank).  After the armistice, the Allies wanted to try d'Elsa as a war criminal for his alleged role in atrocities committed against Belgian civilians.

From 1918 to 1922, d'Elsa was president of the Saxon War Veterans' Association.  He retired from the Army on 21 January 1920. D'Elsa died on 20 July 1922 at Tannenfeld bei Nöbdenitz, in the Löbichau district of Thuringia.

Honours
 National
 : 
Grand Cross of the Order of Merit of Saxony
Knight Grand Cross in the Albert Order, with Swords on Rings 
Commander 2nd Class of the Military Order of St. Henry on 3 May 1915 
 Royal Saxon Cross Service Award

Foreign

Family
D'Elsa was married twice, firstly in 1875 to Margarethe Anna Elise (née Andrée).  After her death in 1888, he remarried in 1891 to Caroline Charlotte (née von Stieglitz).  He had three sons, Walther, Karl and Johann, and three daughters, Elisabeth, Margarethe Dorothe and Priska.

Glossary
Armee-Abteilung or Army Detachment in the sense of "something detached from an Army".  It is not under the command of an Army so is in itself a small Army.
Armee-Gruppe or Army Group in the sense of a group within an Army and under its command, generally formed as a temporary measure for a specific task.
Heeresgruppe or Army Group in the sense of a number of armies under a single commander.

References

Bibliography 
 
 

1849 births
1922 deaths
Military personnel from Dresden
German Army generals of World War I
German military personnel of the Franco-Prussian War
Recipients of the Pour le Mérite (military class)
Recipients of the Military Merit Order (Bavaria), 1st class
Recipients of the Order of the Rising Sun
Recipients of the Order of the Sacred Treasure
Grand Crosses of the Order of Franz Joseph
Recipients of the Iron Cross (1870), 2nd class
Crosses of Military Merit
People from the Kingdom of Saxony
Colonel generals of Saxony